Atypus, also called purseweb spiders, is a genus of  atypical tarantulas first described by Pierre André Latreille in 1804. It occurs in Eurasia, with one species (A. affinis) reaching into North Africa, and one species (A. snetsingeri) in the USA. Only three of the described species occur in Europe: A. piceus, A. affinis, and A. muralis.

Peasants in the southern Carpathian Mountains used to cut up tubes built by Atypus and cover wounds with the inner lining. It reportedly facilitated healing, and even connected with the skin. This is believed to be due to antiseptic properties of spider silk (which is made of protein).

Identification features
They are three-clawed, medium to large spiders with eight eyes. They have six spinnerets with the median spinneret truncated. The prolateral sides of the maxillae are elongated. The cephalic side of the cephalothorax is elevated. They have large chelicerae with long and thin fangs. The male sternum has marginal ridges.

Species
 it contains 33 species:
Atypus affinis Eichwald, 1830 – Europe (Ireland to Ukraine), North Africa
Atypus baotianmanensis Hu, 1994 – China
Atypus baotingensis Li, Xu, Zhang, Liu, Zhang & Li, 2018 – China (Hainan)
Atypus coreanus Kim, 1985 – Korea
Atypus dorsualis Thorell, 1897 – Myanmar, Thailand
Atypus flexus Zhu, Zhang, Song & Qu, 2006 – China
Atypus formosensis Kayashima, 1943 – Taiwan
Atypus heterothecus Zhang, 1985 – China
Atypus javanus Thorell, 1890 – Indonesia (Java)
Atypus jianfengensis Li, Xu, Zhang, Liu, Zhang & Li, 2018 – China (Hainan)
Atypus karschi Dönitz, 1887 – China, Taiwan, Japan
Atypus lannaianus Schwendinger, 1989 – Thailand
Atypus largosaccatus Zhu, Zhang, Song & Qu, 2006 – China
Atypus ledongensis Zhu, Zhang, Song & Qu, 2006 – China
Atypus magnus Namkung, 1986 – Russia (Far East), Korea
Atypus medius Oliger, 1999 – Russia (Far East)
Atypus minutus Lee, Lee, Yoo & Kim, 2015 – Korea
Atypus muralis Bertkau, 1890 – Central Europe to  Iran and Turkmenistan
Atypus pedicellatus Zhu, Zhang, Song & Qu, 2006 – China
Atypus piceus (Sulzer, 1776) (type) – Europe (France to Russia), Iran
Atypus quelpartensis Namkung, 2002 – Korea
Atypus sacculatus Zhu, Zhang, Song & Qu, 2006 – China
Atypus seogwipoensis Kim, Ye & Noh, 2015 – Korea
Atypus sinensis Schenkel, 1953 – China
Atypus sternosulcus Kim, Kim, Jung & Lee, 2006 – Korea
Atypus suiningensis Zhang, 1985 – China
Atypus suthepicus Schwendinger, 1989 – Thailand
Atypus sutherlandi Chennappaiya, 1935 – India
Atypus suwonensis Kim, Kim, Jung & Lee, 2006 – Korea
Atypus tibetensis Zhu, Zhang, Song & Qu, 2006 – China
Atypus wataribabaorum Tanikawa, 2006 – Japan
Atypus wii Siliwal, Kumar & Raven, 2014 – India
Atypus yajuni Zhu, Zhang, Song & Qu, 2006 – China

References

Atypidae
Mygalomorphae genera
Spiders of Asia
Spiders of Africa
Spiders of North America
Taxa named by Pierre André Latreille